This list comprises all players who have participated in at least one league match for Charlotte Eagles since the USL began keeping archived records in 2003. Players who were on the roster but never played a first team game are not listed; players who appeared for the team in other competitions (US Open Cup, CONCACAF Champions League, etc.) but never actually made an USL appearance are noted at the bottom of the page where appropriate.

A "†" denotes players who only appeared in a single match.
A "*" denotes players who are known to have appeared for the team prior to 2003.

A
  Nelson Akwari
  Amass Amankona
  Jordan Arias
  Gideon Asante
  Samuel Asante

B
  Casey Barton
  Daniel Benton
  Gustavo Bentos
  Jeff Bilyk
  Mark Bloom
  Zak Boggs
  Terry Boss
  Gui Brandao
  Brady Bryant
  Bilal Duckett
  Andriy Budnyy

C
  Sam Casey
  Steward Ceus
  John Clare *
  Jacob Coggins
  Joe Connor
  Scott Cook

D
  Patrick Daka
  Greg Dalby
  Aaron DeLoach
  Dwyane Demmin
  Ryan Di Nunzio
   Richard Dixon
  Daniel Dominguez *
  Jeff Dresser *
  Bilal Duckett
  Brock Duckworth

E
   David Estrada

F
  Aaron Faro
  Pat Fidelia*
  Shaun Francis
  Tafaria Fray

G
  Leo Gajardo
  Nicolas Garcia
  David Geno
   Giuseppe Gentile
  Matt Gold
  Jose Gomez
  Mário Gómez
  J. J. Greer
  Devon Grousis
  Andrew Guastaferro
  Juan Guzman

H
  Evan Harding
  Tyrone Hall
  Daniel Harvey
  Jorge Herrera
  Doug Herrick

I
  Tolani Ibikunle
  Clint Irwin
  Paul Islas

J
  Declan Jogi
  Ben Johnson

K
  Joseph Kabwe
  Christopher Klotz

L
  Jonathan Leathers
  Erik Lefebvre †
  Ryan Leib
  Chris Lemons
  Jonah Long

M
  Simone Mariotti
  Diego Martins
  Ricardo Maxwell-Ordain
  Chris McClellan
  Andy McDermott
  Omar McFarlane
  Ben Meek
  Ishmael Mintah
  Bruce Mottern

N
  Ben Newnam
  Amaury Nunes

O

  Felix Oblio
  Debola Ogunseye
  Stephen Okai
  Fejiro Okiomah

P
  Ben Page
  Curren Page
  Ben Parry *
  Sanjeev Parmar
  Mark Pinch

R
  Christian Ramirez
  Eric Reed
  Kyle Renfro
  Josh Rife
  Cheyne Roberts
  William Clayton Roberts
  Drew Russell
  Adam Ruud
  Darryl Roberts

S
  Worteh Sampson
  Mauricio Salles
  Gregg Schroeder
  Fred Sekyere
  Joey Serralta*
  Steve Shak
  Chad Smith
  Josiah Snelgrove
  Ross Spencer
  Robert Ssejjemba
  Brent Stanze
  Anthony Stovall
  Jamal Sutton
  Dustin Swinehart

T
  Wells Thompson
  Darren Toby
  Kevin Trapp

U
  Trevor Upton

V
  John Vermilya

W
  Corbin Waller
  Nathan Watkins
  Chase Wickham
  Luke Williams
  Alex Woods

Y
  Drew Yates
  Austin Yearwood

Sources

Charlotte Eagles
 
Association football player non-biographical articles